The Starck AS.90 New Look was a sports aircraft built in France in the early 1950s.

Design and development

Variants
AS.90-01Powered by an  Aubier-Dunne V.2D; first flown on 11 June 1950.
AS.90-02(F-PGGB), powered by a  Ava 4A-00; first flown on 19 November 1955 and destroyed in an accident on 31 July 1960.
AS.90 Super New look A redesign of the AS.90 in the early 1980s, with a new wing section and slightly increased dimensions, powered by contemporary low-powered aircraft engines, such as the Citroën Ami 6 conversion delivering .

Specifications (AS-90.01)

References

1950s French aircraft
Single-engined tractor aircraft
Aircraft first flown in 1951